Cole Allen Wilson Tinkler (born 5 May 1986) is a New Zealand footballer who plays for APIA Leichhardt Tigers in the New South Wales Premier League.

Career
Tinkler played as a right full back for the New Zealand Knights in the Hyundai A-League, and more recently at Waitakere United and Team Wellington in the ASB Premiership.

In 2005 after the demise of the New Zealand Knights Tinkler played for Melville United in the Lotto Sport Italia NRFL Premier, then from 2005 to 2006 he had played for Waitakere United before going to sign for Team Wellington where he played from 2007 to 2008 then Tinkler decided it was time for him to travel overseas to find professional football club he moved to Asia in 2008.
Cole most recently played for Sengkang-Punggol Football Club, in the S-League in Singapore where he has been plying his trade since 2008. He made his debut against Gombak United Football Club and helped the club reach its first ever finals, the Singapore League Cup Final. However, they were to lose 4–0.

International career
In January 2006, he received his first call-up for the All Whites, the New Zealand national team, for the series against Malaysia, in February 2006. However, he didn't play in any of the matches.
He was included in the New Zealand squad for the football tournament at the Summer Olympics in Beijing where he played in two group matches; the 1–1 draw with China, and 0–1 loss to Belgium.

References

External links
 New Zealand Football profile

1986 births
Living people
New Zealand association footballers
Footballers at the 2008 Summer Olympics
Olympic association footballers of New Zealand
New Zealand Knights FC players
Team Wellington players
Hougang United FC players
Sportspeople from Hamilton, New Zealand
Expatriate footballers in Singapore
Singapore Premier League players
Association football defenders